Allocharopa is a genus of very small air-breathing land snails, terrestrial pulmonate gastropod mollusks in the family Charopidae.

Species
Species within the genus Allocharopa include:

 Allocharopa erskinensis
 Allocharopa okeana
 Allocharopa tarravillensis

References

Charopidae
Taxonomy articles created by Polbot